Ole Kristian Kråkmo (born 29 December 1985) is a retired Norwegian football midfielder and later manager.

He played youth football for Heimdal, junior football for Rosenborg and represented Norway as a youth international. He spent his entire senior career in Ranheim from 2005 to 2014, except for the year 2007 in Skeid and the years 2011 in Eliteserien with Haugesund.

References

1985 births
Living people
Norwegian footballers
Ranheim Fotball players
Skeid Fotball players
FK Haugesund players
Norwegian First Division players
Eliteserien players
Association football midfielders
Norway youth international footballers